Centropogon licayensis is a species of plant in the family Campanulaceae. It is endemic to Ecuador.  Its natural habitat is subtropical or tropical moist montane forests.

References

Flora of Ecuador
licayensis
Vulnerable plants
Taxonomy articles created by Polbot